Bagrat I the Minor (Bagrat Mts'ire; died 1372), of the Bagrationi dynasty, was king of western Georgian kingdom of Imereti from 1329 until 1330, when he was reduced to a vassal duke by George V of Georgia.

Career 
Bagrat was the only known son of King Michael of Imereti, on whose death he succeeded in 1329. Still a minor at this time (hence, his moniker mts'ire), Bagrat was compelled to remain in his capital, Kutatisi, as the provinces were being divided by the rivaling noble factions. In 1330, George V, the resurgent king in eastern Georgia, took advantage of the situation and of being Bagrat's relative and crossed the Likhi Range into Imereti, being welcomed by many Imeretians, weary of persistent violence and anarchy. Imereti was conquered and the integrity of the Kingdom of Georgia restored. Henceforth, Bagrat sat as eristavi ("duke") in Imereti, with his seat in Shorapani, under the tutelage of George V.

Family 
In 1358, Bagrat married, with the approval of David IX of Georgia, a daughter of Qvarqvare I, a Jaqeli atabeg of Samtskhe. They had three sons:

 Alexander I (died 1389), Duke of Imereti (1372–1378), King of Imereti (1387–1389). 
 George I (died 1392), King of Imereti (1389–1392). 
 Constantine II (died 1401), King of Imereti (1396–1401).

References 

Kings of Imereti
1372 deaths
Year of birth unknown
Bagrationi dynasty of the Kingdom of Imereti
Eastern Orthodox monarchs
14th-century people from Georgia (country)